"Gray Wolf" is a song by Latvian rock band Crow Mother from their second album. It was released as the single from the album on 01 Dec 2014.

References

2014 songs